Vidalia is a tropical red algae genus in the family Rhodomelaceae.

Vidalenolone is a phenolic compound that can be found in the genus Vidalia .

Species 
 Vidalia cliftonii Harvey S 
 Vidalia colensoi (J.D.Hooker & Harvey) J.Agardh P 
 Vidalia daemeliana Sonder P 
 Vidalia daemelii Sonder S 
 Vidalia fimbriata var. neocaledonica Grunow ex Falkenber P 
 Vidalia fimbriata (Lamouroux) J.Agardh S 
 Vidalia gregaria Falkenberg S 
 Vidalia intermedia J.Agardh S 
 Vidalia kuetzingioides (Harvey) J.Agardh P 
 Vidalia melvillii (J.Agardh) F.Schmitz S 
 Vidalia obtusiloba (Mertens ex C.Agardh) J.Agardh S 
 Vidalia pumila Sonder S 
 Vidalia serrata (Suhr) J.Agardh S 
 Vidalia spiralis (Lamouroux) Lamouroux ex J.Agardh C - type
 Vidalia volubilis (Linnaeus) J.Agardh S

References 

Rhodomelaceae
Red algae genera